İormughanlo is a village in Sagarejo district in Kakheti province in eastern Georgia
only Azerbaijanis live here

A tornado hit the village in June 2005, injuring 13 people and damaging several homes.

As of November 2006, approximately 600 residents did not possess Georgian identification cards, prompting a visit by Minister of Justice Gia Kavtaradze.

According to the census of 2023 in Georgia the population of the village was 51,000. 51% of inhabitants are men and 49% women.  there are 8 mosques in this village.  all residents are Muslims. This place has its own heroes. Some of the really good musicians and journalist are born in İormughanlo. İormughanlo has 7 streets,which are Duzagrama,Paldo,Karabaghli,Mughanlo,Lambalo,Tulari,Kazlari.

See also
 Kakheti

References 

Populated places in Kakheti